The British Ordnance BL 12 inch gun Mk IX on truck, railway mounted surplus 12 inch Mk IX W naval guns, manufactured by Woolwich Arsenal in 1906, on various railway platforms to provide mobile long-range heavy artillery for the British Army on the Western Front in World War I.

History 
Vickers mounted two Mk IX W guns on slightly different railway mountings, Mk I, from September 1915. They are both identified by the open-frame appearance, recoil buffers above the barrel and the bogies with frames between the wheels similar to locomotive bogies. One mounting has a distinctive diamond-shape from the side and has a warping winch on the front; the other's carriage has a more squared-off profile with no warping winch at the front. The weapons on the Mk I mountings were originally reserve guns for HMS Cornwallis.

Elswick Ordnance Company (Armstrongs) mounted two more on its own design of Mk II railway mounting, delivered to the Western Front in August 1916. They are identified by the boxed-in frame appearance, recoil buffers below the barrel and the bogies with frames outside the wheels.

Design 
The gun cars allowed only 1° left and right traverse, achieved by pivoting the entire gun car body about the forward bogies, in the two Vickers carriages, or about the rear bogies in the Armstrong carriages. Like most railway guns in the war it was operated on specially-constructed curved sections of track and moved forward or backward to point it at a new target.

The initial shock of firing was absorbed by a hydro-spring mechanism, allowing  of recoil within the gun mounting. This "rolling recoil" system allowed the gun to be operated without the need to construct a pit with a strong static platform below the gun for it to recoil into and to allow transmission of all the recoil force directly to the ground as was typical of many large US and French railway guns.

Combat service 

At the end of World War I, the dispositions of the guns on the Western Front were: 1 gun of 92 Battery and 1 gun of 543 Battery with First Army i.e. Artois; 1 gun of 92 Battery with Third Army i.e. Somme; 1 gun of 543 Battery with Fourth Army i.e. Somme.

See also 
List of railway artillery
BL 12 inch Mk IX naval gun

Weapons of comparable role, performance and era 
 Canon de 305 mm Modèle 1893/96 gun French equivalent railway gun

Notes

References

Bibliography

External links 
 

World War I railway artillery of the United Kingdom
Railway guns
305 mm artillery